The 2011 Edinburgh Sevens was a rugby union sevens tournament, part of the 2010–11 IRB Sevens World Series. The competition was held from May 28–29 at Murrayfield Stadium in Scotland and featured 16 teams.

Format 
The tournament consisted of four round-robin pools of four teams. All sixteen teams progressed to the knockout stage. The top two teams from each group progressed to quarter-finals in the main competition, with the winners of those quarter-finals competing in cup semi-finals and the losers competing in plate semi-finals. The bottom two teams from each group progressed to quarter-finals in the consolation competition, with the winners of those quarter-finals competing in bowl semi-finals and the losers competing in shield semi-finals.

Teams 
The following teams participated:

Pool stage

Pool A

Pool B

Pool C

Pool D

Knockout stage

Shield

Bowl

Plate

Cup

References

External links

Edinburgh Sevens
2011 Edinburgh Sevens
Edinburgh Sevens
Edinburgh Sevens